Decoding Annie Parker is a 2013 drama film written and directed by Steven Bernstein. The film stars Samantha Morton, Helen Hunt and Aaron Paul. The film tells the story of Annie Parker and the discovery of the BRCA1 breast cancer gene.

Plot
Eleven-year-old Annie Parker is living the perfect young life, loved by all, and especially by her mother, father, and older sister. But none of them knows that something horrible is stalking their perfect family. On a fall afternoon in 1976, young Annie hears a noise from upstairs. Her mother has collapsed and died, and an agonizing downward spiral begins.

At UC Berkeley a brilliant research geneticist named Mary-Claire King is embarking on something of a personal crusade to uncover the genetic roots of breast cancer. While still in her twenties, she has already made a famous discovery that made the cover of the prestigious journal Science—quantifying the genetic variation between humans and chimpanzees. But her conviction that there is a hereditary basis to at least some forms of breast cancer is not widely shared. Nevertheless, her tireless research throughout the 1980s would end in a medical breakthrough—the discovery of the location of the BRCA1 hereditary breast cancer gene—considered one of the most important scientific discoveries of the twentieth century.

At the age of 19, after the sudden death of her father, Anne marries Paul and soon is pregnant. She struggles to find a way in the world with her equally young but misguided husband and her older sister, Joan Parker who tries to become a surrogate parent to Anne. But, cruelly, Joan contracts the same cancer that killed their mother, and in a few months, she, too, is dead.

Annie is diagnosed with the same disease that killed her mother and sister—breast cancer. It is severe, and surgery and chemotherapy, with all the accompanying difficulties, soon follow. She loses her hair, and if that wasn't enough to endure, her husband, never really mature or stable, has begun an affair with Anne’s closest friend Louise, and leaves her. Paul is soon diagnosed with cancer and expires shortly before she is diagnosed with a second cancer.

While Annie struggles, King is pursuing her belief that some forms of breast and ovarian cancer have a hereditary basis. While she captures headlines for her work applying DNA fingerprinting to help reunite "the disappeared" with their families in Argentina, her priority is to map the breast cancer gene. King focuses on collecting families with a particularly high incidence of breast cancer, suspecting that these cases are most likely to reveal any genetic predispositions. Advances in genetic mapping through the 1980s gradually allow her team to embark on studies to map the location of the BRCA1 gene. Finally, in 1990, King and her team find conclusive evidence linking DNA markers on chromosome 17 with an inherited flaw in a gene dubbed BRCA1. The work was presented at the American Society of Human Genetics conference in Cincinnati, and published in Science a short time later.

Mary Claire King ended up on the cover of Time, and Anne Parker finally had the answer she herself had long sought. Anne Parker happily remarried, and a few years later contracts cancer for a third time. And survives again. And she laughed while being treated, for reasons only she knew and understood.

Cast
 Samantha Morton as Annie Parker
 Helen Hunt as Mary-Claire King
 Aaron Paul as Paul
 Rashida Jones as Kim
 Richard Schiff as Mr. Allen
 Bradley Whitford as Marshall Parker
 Bob Gunton as Dr. Benton
 Alice Eve as Louise
 Maggie Grace as Sarah
 Corey Stoll as Sean
 Ben McKenzie as Tom
 Mageina Tovah as Ellen
 James Tupper as Steve
 Kate Micucci as Rachel
 Spencer Garrett as David
 Marley Shelton as Joan Parker
 Robert Pine as Dr. Frank
 Chris Mulkey as Ralph Parker

Production
Filming began in October 2011 and wrapped in November 2011. Post-production was completed in 2012.

Awards
 Director Steven Bernstein was awarded The Alfred P. Sloan Feature Film Prize at the 2013 Hamptons International Film Festival.
 Samantha Morton was awarded the Best Actress Golden Space Needle Award at the 2013 Seattle International Film Festival for her portrayal of Annie Parker.

2014 Milan International Film Festival
 Steven Bernstein was nominated as Best Director.
 Steven Bernstein, Adam Bernstein and Michael Moss were nominated as Best Screenwriters.
 Samantha Morton was nominated as Best Actress for her portrayal of Annie Parker.
 Helen Hunt won the Best Supporting Actress award for her portrayal of Dr. Mary-Claire King.
 Aaron Paul won the Best Supporting Actor award for his portrayal of Paul.
 Ted Hayash was nominated as Best Cinematographer.
 Douglas Crise was nominated as Best Editor.

Release
The film was released domestically by Entertainment One Films simultaneously in theaters and video-on-demand on May 2, 2014.

References

External links
 
 
 
 
 

2013 films
2013 drama films
American drama films
Films scored by Steven Bramson
2010s English-language films
2010s American films